Informatics is the study of computational systems. According to the ACM Europe Council and Informatics Europe, informatics is synonymous with computer science and computing as a profession, in which the central notion is transformation of information. In other countries, the term "informatics" is used with a different meaning in the context of library science, in which case it is synonymous with data storage and retrieval.

Different meanings 

In some countries, depending on local interpretations, the term "informatics" is used synonymously to mean information systems, information science, information theory, information engineering, information technology, information processing, or other theoretical or practical fields. In Germany, the term informatics almost exactly corresponds to modern computer science. Accordingly, universities in continental Europe usually translate "informatics" as computer science, or sometimes information and computer science, although technical universities may translate it as computer science & engineering.

In the United States, however, the term informatics is mostly used in context of data science, library science or its applications in healthcare (health informatics), where it first appeared in the US.

The University of Washington uses this term to refer to social computing. In some countries, this term is associated with natural computation and neural computation.

The Government of Canada uses the term to refer to operational units offering network and computer services to the various departments.

Etymology 

In 1956, the German informatician Karl Steinbuch and engineer Helmut Gröttrup coined the word Informatik when they developed the Informatik-Anlage for the Quelle mail-order management, one of the earliest commercial applications of data processing. In April 1957, Steinbuch published a paper called Informatik: Automatische Informationsverarbeitung ("Informatics: Automatic Information Processing"). The morphology—informat-ion + -ics—uses "the accepted form for names of sciences, as conics, mathematics, linguistics, optics, or matters of practice, as economics, politics, tactics", and so, linguistically, the meaning extends easily to encompass both the science of information and the practice of information processing. The German word Informatik is usually translated to English as computer science by universities or computer science & engineering by technical universities (German equivalents for institutes of technology). Depending on the context, informatics is also translated into computing, scientific computing or information and computer technology. The French term informatique was coined in 1962 by Philippe Dreyfus. In the same month was also proposed independently by Walter F. Bauer (1924–2015) and associates who co-founded software company Informatics Inc. The term for the new discipline quickly spread throughout Europe, but it did not catch on in the United States. Over the years, many different definitions of informatics have been developed, most of them claim that the essence of informatics is one of these concepts: information processing, algorithms, computation, information, algorithmic processes, computational processes or computational systems.

The earliest uses of the term informatics in the United States was during the 1950s with the beginning of computer use in healthcare.  Early practitioners interested in the field soon learned that there were no formal education programs, and none emerged until the late 1960s. They introduced the term informatics only in the context of archival science, which is only a small part of informatics. Professional development, therefore, played a significant role in the development of health informatics. According to Imhoff et al., 2001, healthcare informatics is not only the application of computer technology to problems in healthcare, but covers all aspects of generation, handling, communication, storage, retrieval, management, analysis, discovery, and synthesis of data information and knowledge in the entire scope of healthcare. Furthermore, they stated that the primary goal of health informatics can be distinguished as follows: To provide solutions for problems related to data, information, and knowledge processing. To study general principles of processing data information and knowledge in medicine and healthcare. The term health informatics quickly spread throughout the United States in various forms such as nursing informatics, public health informatics or medical informatics. Analogous terms were later introduced for use of computers in various fields, such as business informatics, forest informatics, legal informatics etc. These fields still mainly use term informatics in context of library science.

Informatics as library science 

In the fields of geoinformatics or irrigation informatics, the term -informatics usually mean information science, in context related to library science. This was the first meaning of informatics introduced in Russia in 1966 by A.I. Mikhailov, R.S. Gilyarevskii, and A.I. Chernyi, which referred to a scientific discipline that studies the structure and properties of scientific information. In this context, the term was also used by the International Neuroinformatics Coordinating Facility. Some scientists use this term, however, to refer to the science of information processing, not data management.

In the English-speaking world, the term informatics was first widely used in the compound medical informatics, taken to include "the cognitive, information processing, and communication tasks of medical practice, education, and research, including information science and the technology to support these tasks". Many such compounds are now in use; they can be viewed as different areas of "applied informatics".

Informatics as information processing science 

In the early 1990s, K.K. Kolin proposed an interpretation of informatics as a fundamental science that studies information processes in nature, society, and technical systems.

A broad interpretation of informatics, as "the study of the structure, algorithms, behaviour, and interactions of natural and artificial computational systems," was introduced by the University of Edinburgh in 1994. This has led to the merger of the institutes of computer science, artificial intelligence and cognitive science into a single School of Informatics in 2002.

More than a dozen nearby universities joined Scottish Informatics and Computer Science Alliance. Some non-European universities have also adopted this definition (e.g. Kyoto University School of Informatics).

In 2003, Yingxu Wang popularized term cognitive informatics, described as follows:

Informatics as a fundamental science of information in natural and artificial systems was proposed again in Russia in 2006.

In 2007, the influential book Decoding the Universe was published.

Former president of Association for Computing Machinery, Peter Denning wrote in 2007:

The 2008 Research Assessment Exercise, of the UK Funding Councils, includes a new, Computer Science and Informatics, unit of assessment (UoA), whose scope is described as follows:
The UoA includes the study of methods for acquiring, storing, processing, communicating and reasoning about information, and the role of interactivity in natural and artificial systems, through the implementation, organisation and use of computer hardware, software and other resources. The subjects are characterised by the rigorous application of analysis, experimentation and design.
In 2008, the construction of the Informatics Forum was completed. In 2018, the MIT Schwarzman College of Computing was established. Its construction is planned to be completed in 2021.

 Controversial fields 
 evolutionary informatics - a new field that comes from the concept of an intelligent design. According to Evolutionary Informatics Lab, evolutionary informatics studies how evolving systems incorporate, transform, and export information. In 2017, the influential book "Introduction To Evolutionary Informatics" was published. Informatics as computer science 

 Related topics 
Computer scientists study computational processes and systems. Computing Research Repository (CoRR) classification distinguishes the following main topics in computer science (alphabetic order):

 artificial intelligence
 computation and language
 computational complexity
 computational engineering, finance, and science
 computational geometry
 computational game theory
 computer vision and pattern recognition
 computers and society
 cryptography and security
 data structures and algorithms
 databases and digital libraries
 distributed, parallel and cluster computing
 emerging technologies
 formal languages and automata theory
 general literature
 graphics
 hardware architecture
 human-computer Interaction
 information retrieval
 information theory
 logic in computer science
 machine learning
 mathematical software
 multiagent systems
 multimedia
 networking and internet architecture
 neural computing and evolutionary computing
 numerical analysis
 operating systems
 other computer science
 performance
 programming languages
 robotics
 social and information networks
 software engineering
 sound
 symbolic computation
 systems and control

 Journals and conferences 

 Information and Computation Acta Informatica Information Processing Letters Neural Information Processing Systems Journal of Automata, Languages and Combinatorics International Journal of Cognitive Informatics and Natural Intelligence Conference on Computer Vision and Pattern Recognition)
 Symposium on Theory of Computing European Conference on Computer Vision Brain Informatics International Conference on Computer Vision International Conference on Machine Learning Algorithmica Symposium on Foundations of Computer Science) European Symposium on Algorithms Fundamenta Informaticae Symposium on Discrete Algorithms Journal of Logic and Computation Bioinformatics
 Neural Computing and Applications Autonomous Agents and Multi-Agent Systems
 International Symposium on Fundamentals of Computation Theory 
 International Colloquium on Automata, Languages and Programming Journal of Scientific Computing Annual IEEE Symposium on Foundations of Computer Science 
 Annual Symposium on Computational Geometry Simulation & Gaming Journal of Machine Learning Research Journal of Artificial Intelligence Research ACM Transactions on Graphics IEEE Transactions on Visualization and Computer Graphics IEEE Transactions on Computers IEEE/ACM International Symposium on Microarchitecture ACM Symposium on Computer and Communications Security Symposium on Parallelism in Algorithms and Architectures Symposium on Foundations of Computer Science''

Community

Related organisations 

 Informatics Europe
 Association for Computing Machinery
 IEEE Computer Society
 Scottish Informatics and Computer Science Alliance
 Computing Research Association
 Association for the Advancement of Artificial Intelligence
 American Society for Information Science and Technology
 International Federation for Information Processing
 Association for Logic, Language and Information
 Gesellschaft für Informatik
 Association for Women in Computing
 Computer Science Teachers Association
 Computability in Europe
 European Association for Theoretical Computer Science
 Raspberry Pi Foundation

Academic schools and departments 

 Information School at University of Washington
 College of Emergency Preparedness, Homeland Security and Cybersecurity at University at Albany, SUNY
 Department of Informatics at University of California, Irvine
 College of Literature, Science, and the Arts at University of Michigan
 School of Information at The University of Texas at Austin
 Manning College of Information & Computer Sciences at University of Massachusetts Amherst
 Texas Women's University
 College of Literature, Science, and the Arts at University of Michigan
 Department of Informatics at Indiana University Bloomington
 School of Informatics and Computing at Indiana University–Purdue University Indianapolis
 School of Information at San Jose State University
 School of Computing and Informatics at University of Louisiana at Lafayette
 Department of Computer Science at The University of Iowa
 Ira A. Fulton Schools of Engineering at Arizona State University
 School of Informatics, Computing, and Cyber Systems at Northern Arizona University
 School of Engineering and Computer Science at Baylor University
 College of Information Sciences and Technology at Pennsylvania State University
 College of Engineering and Computing at University of South Carolina
 Doctoral School of Informatics at University of Debrecen
 School of Information Sciences at University of Illinois Urbana-Champaign
 University of Sussex
 Institute for Data Science & Informatics at University of Missouri
 Norwegian University of Science and Technology
 Department of Informatics at University of Bergen
 School of Informatics at University of Edinburgh
 Department of Informatics at Technical University of Munich
 Università della Svizzera italiana
 List of Information Schools

See also

 Information science
 Behavior informatics
 Computational theory of mind
 Models of neural computation
 Cellular automaton
 Computer simulation
 Computational circuit
 Entscheidungsproblem
 Swarm intelligence
 Biomimetics
 Information processing
 Robotics
 Algorithmics
 Neural computation
 Real-time computing
 Computer architecture
 Artificial intelligence
 Machine learning

References

Further reading 

 
 
 
 
 
 
 
 

Artificial intelligence
Cognitive science
Computer science education
Information science
Computational fields of study